Barrasford railway station served the village of Barrasford, Northumberland, England from 1859 to 1958 on the Border Counties Railway.

History 
The station opened on 1 December 1859 by the North British Railway. The station was situated on a lane to Catheugh 200 yards northeast of the centre of Barrasford village. A siding adjoined the line opposite the platform and there was a further loop to the northwest. Both of these were controlled by a signal box, which was at the northwest end of the platform.

The station was host to a camping coach from 1936 to 1939.

The station was closed to passengers on 15 October 1956 but remained open for goods traffic until 1 September 1958, although it was downgraded towards an unstaffed public siding.

References

Bibliography

External links 
 

Disused railway stations in Northumberland
Former North British Railway stations
Railway stations in Great Britain opened in 1859
Railway stations in Great Britain closed in 1956
1859 establishments in England
1958 disestablishments in England